The 1941–42 season saw Rochdale compete for their 3rd season in the wartime league (League North). The first 18 matches were in the 1st Championship, in which Rochdale finished 22nd out of 38 clubs. The remaining matches were in the 2nd Championship (in which Rochdale did not play enough matches to be included in the final table). These matches were also league war cup qualifiers. Matches 28 to 31 were also in the Lancashire Cup.

Statistics
												

|}

Competitions

Football League North

References

Rochdale A.F.C. seasons
Rochdale